BU Crucis (HD 111934) is a variable star in the open cluster NGC 4755, which is also known as the Kappa Crucis Cluster or Jewel Box Cluster.

Location

BU Cru is one of the brightest members of the NGC 4775 open cluster, better known as the Jewel Box Cluster.  It forms the right end of the bar of the prominent letter "A" asterism at the centre of the cluster.  The cluster is part of the larger Centaurus OB1 association and lies about 8,500 light years away.

The cluster, and BU Crucis itself, is just to the south-east of β Crucis, the lefthand star of the famous Southern Cross.

Properties
BU Crucis is a B2 bright supergiant (luminosity class Ia).  It is 275,000 times the luminosity of the sun, partly due to its higher temperature over 20,000 K, and partly to being forty times larger than the sun.  The κ Crucis cluster has a calculated age of 11.2 million years, and BU Crucis itself around five million years.

Variability

BU Crucis is a variable star with a brightness range of about 0.1 magnitudes.  It is listed as a probable eclipsing binary in the General Catalogue of Variable Stars, but the International Variable Star Index classifies it as an α Cygni variable with a visual magnitude range of 6.82 - 7.01.

References

External links
 

Crux (constellation)
111934
B-type supergiants
062913
CD-59 04458
J12533761-6021254
Suspected variables
Alpha Cygni variables
Eclipsing binaries
Crucis, BU